Village 1104 is a first-person narrative which revolves around a professor, Abhimanyu Shergill, and four children, Sid, Rishabh, Murari and Priya. Prateek, in this book, talks about the various kinds of pressure an Indian student has to go through: parental pressure, peer pressure and gender-biases and focuses on the limitations of the Indian educational system. The book narrates how these four "failures" in the city end up in a village which is too insignificant to even be given a name in the Indian Government directory. The book focuses on the growth of this group as they join forces to change the reality for the village.

Characters
Abhimanyu Shergill
Siddhart
Priya
Rishabh
Murari
Sukhlal ji
Akriti
Naresh
Mr. Bhandari
Mrs. Bhandari
Mr. Bhardawaj

About the author

Village 1104 was the debut book by Prateek Arora who wrote it at the age of 16. Via this book, Prateek pulled from his own life experience and channeled his frustrations of the Indian education system. The book received coverage in seven Indian newspapers and referenced by various politicians to highlight the needed shift in an infrastructure-starved, legacy education system failing to serve the Indian youth.

References

 The Deccan Chronicle, 16 March 2010, Jyoti Verma, "Born with a pen", New Delhi
 The Hindu, 16 March 2010, Poonam Kumar, "School notes", New Delhi
 The Asian Age, 16 March 2010, Jyoti Verma, "Born with a pen-how to strike a balance between your inner passion and your studies"
 Born with a pen, Jyoti Verma, Deccan Chronicle 
 Budding young writer of DPS RK Puram 
 Born with a pen, Asian Age 
 World News-Born with a pen
 The Hindu, March 16, 2010 
 Indiatimes, March 2010 

2010 Indian novels
Indian English-language novels
Novels set in India
2010 debut novels